As Feathers to Flowers and Petals to Wings is Twelve Tribes' first album.

Track listing
"Strings" - (3:49) 
"As Ghosts Are Given to Me" - (4:08) 
"Blowing Kisses" - (2:59) 
"Still" - (1:37) 
"Then Days Away" - (2:32) 
"Killing Tonight for Every Love's Money" - (4:21) 
"Faith, Hope's Dirty Knife" - (3:12) 
"Mr. Bear" - (11:04) 
"Abaddon" - (5:48) 
"The Devil's Chord" - (2:39)

Credits
Adam Jackson - vocals  
Andrew Corpus - guitar
Kevin Schindel - guitar
Matt Tackett - bass guitar
Shane Shook  - drums

1999 albums
Twelve Tribes (band) albums
Eulogy Recordings albums